Robert Seller (1889–1967) was a French stage and film actor.

Selected filmography
 Love and Luck (1932)
 Chotard and Company (1933)
 Zouzou (1934)
 Excursion Train (1936)
 Adventure in Paris (1936)
 Taras Bulba (1936)
 The Lover of Madame Vidal (1936)
 Ménilmontant (1936)
 Let's Make a Dream (1936)
 The Two Boys (1936)
 The Pearls of the Crown (1937)
 The Green Jacket (1937)
 Josette (1937)
 The Patriot (1938)
 Mollenard (1938)
 The Man Who Seeks the Truth (1940)
 Happy Go Lucky (1946)
 Jericho (1946)
 Goodbye Darling (1946)
 Special Mission (1946)
 Destiny Has Fun (1947)
Judicial Error (1948)
 The Lame Devil (1948)
 The Treasure of Cantenac (1950)
 Casimir (1950)
 Monsieur Octave (1951)
 Deburau (1951)
 Darling Caroline (1951)
 The Lady of the Camellias (1953)
 My Childish Father (1953)
 Le Secret d'Hélène Marimon (1954)
 Mademoiselle from Paris (1955)
 Paris, Palace Hotel (1956)
 How to Succeed in Love (1962)

References

Bibliography
 Crisp, C.G. The classic French cinema, 1930-1960. Indiana University Press, 1993

External links

1889 births
1967 deaths
French male film actors
French male stage actors
Male actors from Paris